Lauritz Thura Thrap Schmidt (1 May 1897 – 27 June 1970) was a Norwegian yacht racer and businessperson.

He was born in Kristiania as a son of jurist Axel Schmidt (1863–1930) and Petra Jensen. He finished his secondary education in 1915, took commerce school and practical training in Hamburg. In 1927 he married wholesaler's daughter Ingeborg Molstad.

As a yacht racer he competed in the 1920 Summer Olympics and in the 1936 Summer Olympics. In 1920 he was a crew member of the Norwegian boat Lyn-2, which won the silver medal in the 8 metre class (1919 rating). Sixteen years later he won his second silver medal in the 8 metre class. He represented the Royal Norwegian Yacht Club.

He spent his professional career as manager of the book printer Nationaltrykkeriet and the bookbinder Forlagsbokbinderiet, from  1926. He chaired the Association for the Promotion of Skiing from 1939 to 1946, having been a board member since 1927.

References

External links
 

1897 births
1970 deaths
Norwegian expatriates in Germany
Norwegian male sailors (sport)
Sailors at the 1920 Summer Olympics – 8 Metre
Sailors at the 1936 Summer Olympics – 8 Metre
Olympic sailors of Norway
Olympic silver medalists for Norway
Olympic medalists in sailing
Norwegian sports executives and administrators
Medalists at the 1936 Summer Olympics
Medalists at the 1920 Summer Olympics